The following is a list of Canadian Ministers of Industry.

References
Department of Trade and Commerce

Canadian ministers
Ministers of Industry, Trade and Commerce